The lecherous millionaire is a thought experiment devised by Joel Feinberg to illustrate questions concerning coercion. It presents a scenario in which a millionaire offers to pay for medical care for a woman's ill child on the condition that she has sexual relations with him. While the millionaire is making an offer, he nevertheless seems to be coercing the woman.

See also
 Throffer
 Indecent Proposal

Further reading

Thought experiments in ethics